The 1926 Simmons Cowboys football team was an American football team that represented Simmons University (later known as Hardin-Simmons University) as a member of the Texas Conference during the 1926 college football season. In its first and only season under head coach Victor Payne, the team compiled a 6–1–3 record and outscored all opponents by a total of 85 to 46. The team played its home games at Parramore Field in Abilene, Texas.  Simmons won the Texas Conference title with a mark of 2–0–1.

Schedule

References

Simmons
Hardin–Simmons Cowboys football seasons
Simmons Cowboys football